Thomas or Tom Malone may refer to:

Law and politics
 Thomas Malone (politician) (1875–1926), Canadian politician
 Thomas Paul Malone, former Canadian ambassador to Israel
 Thomas H. Malone (1834–1906), judge, dean of Vanderbilt University Law School, Confederate veteran
 Tom Malone (judge) (born 1953), judge on the Kansas Court of Appeals

Sports
 Tom Malone (American football) (born 1984), American football player
 Thomas Malone (cricketer) (1876–1933), New Zealand cricketer
 Tom Malone (hurler) (born 1952), Irish hurler
 Tom Malone, steeplechase jockey, rode in the 2008 Grand National

Other
 Thomas W. Malone (born 1952), professor at the MIT Sloan School of Management
 Thomas Winer Malone (born 1929), Bahamian wooden boat builder
 Thomas F. Malone (1917–2013), American geophysicist
 Tom Malone (musician) (born 1947), jazz trombonist for the Blues Brothers
 Tommy Malone, member of The Subdudes rock band